One and Only is the second studio album by Christian rock band Big Daddy Weave.  This was their first release with a major label in Fervent Records. It was released on July 30, 2002.  This album charted at No. 22 on the Billboard's Independent Albums chart on August 17, 2002.

Track listing

Personnel 

Big Daddy Weave
 Mike Weaver – lead vocals, acoustic guitar, background vocals
 Jeremy Redmon – electric guitar, background vocals 
 Jay Weaver – bass guitar, background vocals (7)
 Jeff Jones – drums 
 Joe Shirk – saxophone

Additional Musicians
 Byron Hagen – acoustic piano, keyboards, Hammond B3 organ
 Ken Lewis – percussion 
 Jason Trimble – live loops (3, 8, 9)
 Shelley Jennings – guest vocals on "Sacrifice"
 Jennifer Deibler – background vocals (9)
 Brian Smith – background vocals (9)

Choir (Track 2) and Handclaps (Track 5)
 Michael Boggs
 Jennifer Deibler
 Jannell Els
 Kandice Kirkham
 Christy Kroeker
 Matt Kroeker
 Carly O'Quinn
 Alyson Smith
 Brian Smith
 Betsy Trimble 
 Jason Trimble

Party Vocals (Track 4)
 Anna Redmon
 Jeremy Redmon 
 Jay Weaver
 Mike Weaver

Production 
 Jeromy Deibler – producer, A&R direction, vocal recording 
 Susan Riley – executive producer, A&R direction
 Julian Kindred – band track recording, mixing (4, 5, 7, 9, 10)
 Joey Turner – additional band track recording, band track recording assistant, digital editing, transfers
 James Felver – percussion recording, vocal recording
 Tom Laune – mixing (1, 2, 3, 6, 8)
 Tony High – mix assistant (4, 5, 7, 9, 10)
 J.C. Monterrosa – mix assistant (4, 5, 7, 9, 10)
 Hank Williams – mastering
 Carly O'Quinn – production coordinator 
 Tim Parker – art direction, design
 Russ Harrington – photography

Studios 
 Recorded at OmniSound Studios (Nashville, Tennessee) and Dark Horse Recording Studio (Franklin, Tennessee).
 Tracks 1, 2, 3, 6 & 8 mixed at Bridgeway Studios (Nashville, Tennessee).
 Tracks 4, 5, 7, 9 & 10 mixed at Sound Kitchen (Franklin, Tennessee).
 Mastered at MasterMix (Nashville, Tennessee).

References

External links
Official album page

2002 albums
Big Daddy Weave albums
Fervent Records albums